Justin Marc Engelke (born 3 April 1976) is a former South African cricketer. Engelke was a right-handed batsman who bowled right-arm medium-fast. He was born in Cape Town, Cape Province and educated at Park Town Boys School and Rand Afrikaans University.

Engelke made his first-class debut for Transvaal B against Eastern Province B in the 1996/97 UCB Bowl. He made three further first-class appearances for the team in that season, taking 7 wickets at an average of 35.85, with best figures of 2/30. His List debut came for Gauteng (formerly Transvaal) against Easterns in the 1997/98 Standard Bank League. He made sixteen further List A appearances for Gauteng, the last of which came against KwaZulu-Natal in the 1999/00 Standard Bank League. He took 19 wickets in his seventeen List A appearances for the province, which came at an average of 26.73, with best figures of 4/12. He also made a single first-class appearance for Gauteng against 	Griqualand West in the 1998/99 SuperSport Series. He took the wickets of Mickey Arthur and Pieter Barnard in this match, for the cost of 69 runs from 24 overs. In 2000, he played a single List A match in England for Hertfordshire in the 2000 NatWest Trophy against Cambridgeshire, taking the wickets of Simon Kellett, Nigel Gadsby and Ajaz Akhtar. His spell of 10 overs cost only 8 runs, with 8 of his 10 overs being maidens. Despite this, Hertfordshire lost the match by four wickets. Engelke didn't feature in any Minor counties fixtures for the county.

References

External links
Justin Engelke at ESPNcricinfo
Justin Engelke at CricketArchive

1976 births
Living people
Cricketers from Cape Town
University of Johannesburg alumni
South African cricketers
Gauteng cricketers
Hertfordshire cricketers